Culture Monks is a creative enterprise based in Kolkata, India, working since 2012. They are engaged in cultural activism, capacity building of the creative sector, production, training, research & development. Its areas of work includes theatre, storytelling, performance art, visual arts and film making. It is also involved in using art intervention to transform communities towards social development. 

Culture Monks has started a theatre training program for children which is called Young Monks.

References 

  The Telegraph, Kolkata coverage of Culture Monks.
  Culture Monks covered by Italia Art Magazine.
  India Today coverage of Culture Monks
  Kolkata Konnector article about Culture Monks

External links 
 Official website

Culture of Kolkata
Organisations based in Kolkata
Performance art
2012 establishments in West Bengal
Arts organizations established in 2012